Alleged in Their Own Time is the sixth studio album by the psychedelic folk band The Holy Modal Rounders, released in 1975 through Rounder Records.

Track listing

Personnel 

The Holy Modal Rounders
Luke Faust
Robin Remaily
Peter Stampfel
Steve Weber
Antonia Stampfel
Karen Dalton 

Production and design
Linda Mancini – illustration
Bill Barth – mixing

References 

1975 albums
The Holy Modal Rounders albums
Rounder Records albums